Isdiantono (born November 8, 1978 in Banyuwangi) is an Indonesian footballer that currently plays for Persisam Putra Samarinda in the Indonesia Super League.

Club statistics

References

External links

1978 births
Association football defenders
Living people
Indonesian footballers
Liga 1 (Indonesia) players
Persijap Jepara players
Persisam Putra Samarinda players
People from Banyuwangi Regency
Sportspeople from East Java